PierLuigi Samaritani (September 29, 1942, in Novara – January 5, 1994, in Rome) was a renowned opera director/production designer, who began his career at a young age, working alongside some of the greatest names in theatre, opera and ballet, such as Lila de Nobili, Giancarlo Menotti, Franco Zeffirelli, Luciano Pavarotti, Mikhail Baryshnikov, Rudolf Nureyev and many more. Samaritani had an enormous talent, which allowed him to take on all the roles the theatre, opera and ballet demanded, making sure to always be involved in all aspects of his productions even when delegating. From the creation of his "sketches" of the set, which were more like works of art in and of themselves to the smallest change in an extra’s costume, he was a true perfectionist preoccupied with every detail. His productions graced the stage of countless opera houses and theaters, amongst them La Scala di Milano, Teatro Regio of Parma, The Metropolitan Opera House, American Ballet Theatre and the Festival of Two Worlds at Spoleto (Festival dei Due Mondi), where he collaborated for many years, alongside his dear friend, Gian Carlo Menotti. The Teatro Lirico Sperimentale di Spoleto founded in 1947 in Spoleto, by Adriano Belli created a special award carrying the name of Pier Luigi Samaritani, awarded each year to the set designer with the best set design of the opera season.

Education 

Pierluigi Samaritani was born in Novara, Italy and later moved to Milan, Italy to receive his degree from the Academy of Fine Arts of Brera. He soon after went to Paris to continue his studies at L’Ecole Superieure d’Arts et Technique du Théâtre, where he studied under famed stage and costume designer, Lila de Nobili (September 3, 1916 – February 19, 2002). Lila never attended school but dedicated herself to painting and drawing. Her talent show through her work doing cover and high fashion illustrations for Vogue, Hermes and others. De Nobili was well known for her highly romanticized settings. De Nobili would become a huge influence on Samaritani and his work. She was known for her collaborations with Italian directors Luchino Visconti and Franco Zeffirelli, and also did productions in the UK for Laurence Olivier and Peter Hall  at Stratford-Upon-Avon. Hall was founder of the Royal Shakespeare Company and later director of the National Theatre.  Lila de Nobili never married and lived in Paris most her life, though, while working on her productions in the UK, she lived with Peter Hall and his wife, Leslie Caron, who was a close friend of Lila’s at their home in Knightsbridge.

Personal life 

Pierluigi Samaritani had no children and was married only once. His widow, Chilean former model, Maria del Pilar Muñoz Fontaine, has two children (Samaritani’s stepsons): international designer and marchand d’art, Micky Hurley, and his brother, Max Hurley, an entrepreneur and awarded ad man.  The whole family lived together for a time in Samaritani’s villa in Tuscany in the 1990s.

Samaritani died on January 5, 1994, in Rome, after complications from terminal cancer.

Career 

Samaritani worked all over the world, in the most prestigious opera houses and theatres. His favorite theatre was said to be the communal theatre of Florence, for which he produced several works. 
Several conductors, opera registas, set designers and other great artists and talents have used Samaritani's works for their opera productions around the world. Some examples are: Claus Helmet Drese.

The New York Times published an article on June 2, 2015, detailing the shortcomings and highlights of a recent La Bayadère production at the Metropolitan Opera House, based on the production choreographed by the late, famed dancer Natalia Makarova. The article exalts PierLuigi Samaritani's set design as a high-point in the production: "The Makarova production has Pier Luigi Samaritani’s fabulous painted scenery, always a triumph of rich Indian color and successful illusion."

List of productions 1967 - 1986 

 Manfred (Schumann) Teatro dell’Opera di Roma 1967
 I Capricci di Callot (Malpiero) Teatro alla Scala di Milano 1968
 Semiramide (Rossini) Maggio Musicale Fiorentino 1968
 Tristano e Isotta (Wagner) Festival dei Due Mondi di Spoleto 1968
 Maria di Rohan (Donizetti) Teatro alla Scala 1969
 La Clemenza di Tito (Mozart) Teatro dell’Opera di Roma 1969
 El Retablo de maese Pedro (De Falla) Festival dei Due Mondi di Spoleto 1969
 La Vestale (Spontini) Teatro Massimo di Palermo 1970
 Carmen (Bizet) Teatro alla Scala di Milano 1972
 Mosè (Rossini) Maggio Musicale Fiorentino 1973
 Sebastian (Menotti) Teatro Massimo di Palermo 1973
 Boheme (Puccini) TEatro dell’Opera di Roma 1974
 La Falena (Smareglia) Teatro Verdi di Trieste 1975
 Re Cervo (Henze) Maggio Musicale Fiorentino 1976
 La Forza del Destino (Verdi) San Drancisco Opera House 1976
 Luisa Miller (Verdi) Teatro all Scala di Milano 1976
 La Signora delle Camelie (Dumas) Teatro Eliseo di Roma – Compagnia Falk 1976
 La Traviata (Verdi) Teatro dell’Opera di Roma 1977
 Medea in Corinto (Mayr) Teatro San Carlo di Napoli 1977
 Werther (Massenet) Teatro Comunale di Firenze 1978
 Thaïs (Massenet) Teatro dell’Opera di Roma 1978
 Carmen (Bizet) Deutsche Oper Berlin 1979
 Madama Butterfly (Puccini) Teatro Comunale di Firenze 1979
 Faust (Gounod) Chicago Lyric Opera 1979
 La Sonnambula (Bellini) Festival dei Due Mondi di Spoleto 1979
 Lucia di Lammermoor (Donizetti) Arena di Verona 1979
 Eugenio Onieghin (Cajkovskij) Maggio Musicale Fiorentino 1980
 La Bayadere (Minkus) Metropolitan Opera House New York 1980
 Aida (Verdi) Chicago Lyric Opera 1980
 Francesca da Rimini (Zandonai) Teatro Filarmonico di Veronca 1980
 La Sonnambula (Rieti) American Ballet Theatre 1981
 Carmen (Bizet) TEatro Comunale di Firenze 1982
 Le Baiser de la Fee (Stravinskij) Teatro Comunale di Firenze 1982
 Manon (Massenet) Teatro dell’Opera di Roma 1982
 Parsifal (Wagner) Teatro dell’Opera di Roma 1983
 Ernani (Verdi) Metropolitan Opera House New York 1983
 Madama Butterfly (Puccini) Festival Pucciniano di Torre del Lago 1984
 Manon Lescaut (Puccini) Teatro Comunale di Firenze 1985
 Macbeth (Verdi) Teatro Municipal de Santiago 1985
 La Rondine (Puccini) Teatro Regio di Parma 1986

References

Further reading 

Interview with Pierluigi Samaritani, September 19, 1990

1942 births
1994 deaths
Italian opera directors